The Cosmic Cube is a fictional object appearing in American comic books published by Marvel Comics. There are multiple Cubes in the Marvel Universe, all of which are depicted as containment devices that can empower whoever wields them. Although the first version, introduced in Tales of Suspense #79 (July 1966) and created by Stan Lee and Jack Kirby, originated on Earth as a weapon built by Advanced Idea Mechanics, most are of alien origins.

The Cube (renamed the Tesseract) plays a central role in several films of the Marvel Cinematic Universe, in which it is ultimately depicted as containing the Space Stone, one of the six Infinity Stones.

Publication history
The first Cosmic Cube appeared in a story in Tales of Suspense #79–81 (July–Sept. 1966) and was created by Stan Lee and Jack Kirby. It was established as a device created by A.I.M. and capable of transforming any wish into reality, irrespective of the consequences. The Cube was also a plot device in a story that introduced the character of the Super-Adaptoid in Tales of Suspense #82–84 (Oct.–Dec. 1966).  The Cube was also featured in a one-off story in Avengers #40 (1967) being found and briefly wielded by Namor.

The Cube reappeared in Captain America #115–120 (July–Dec. 1969), and featured in an epic cosmic storyline that starred arch-villain Thanos in Daredevil #107 (Jan. 1974) and Captain Marvel #25–33 (March 1972–July 1974, bi-monthly). Retrieved after Thanos' defeat, this original Cube featured in several Project Pegasus stories in Marvel Two-in-One #42–43 (Aug.–Sept. 1978), Marvel Two-in-One #57–58 (Dec. 1979–Jan. 1980), and Marvel Team-Up Annual #5 (1982).

The creation of a second Cube was shown in Super-Villain Team-Up #16–17 (May 1979 and June 1980), but this Cube was initially powerless and did not gain any reality-altering ability until years after its creation.

A major element was added to the Cube's origin—that each is in fact an evolving sentient being—in Captain America Annual #7 (1983). The sentient Cube returned in Avengers #289–290 (March–April 1988) to end the threat of the Super-Adaptoid (itself originally empowered by a "shard" of a Cosmic Cube), and then in Fantastic Four #319 (Oct. 1988). This story revealed that the villain the Molecule Man had ties to the Cube and introduced a new character.

The miniseries The Infinity War #1–6 (June–Nov. 1992) and Infinity Crusade #1–6 (June–Nov. 1993) established that the items actually exist in a variety of geometric forms called Cosmic Containment Units.

A third Cosmic Cube was created during the "Taking A.I.M." storyline that ran through Avengers #386–388 (May–July 1995) and Captain America (vol. 2) #440–441 (June–July 1995). This unstable Cube has not been seen since it was sealed in a containment chamber at the conclusion of the storyline.

The previously powerless second Cosmic Cube finally gained an ability to alter reality in Captain America (vol. 2) #445–448 (November 1995–February 1996) but it was unstable and exploded at the end of that storyline. The second Cube's power reappeared in a storyline in Captain America (vol. 3) #14–19 (Feb.–July 1999) during which its power was internalized within the Red Skull, then stolen by Korvac and taken to an alternate 31st century Earth before being returned to the Red Skull on the present-day Earth, after which it was seemingly destroyed again by exposure to anti-matter energy.

Doctor Doom acquires the Cosmic Cube in the Fantastic Four miniseries The World's Greatest Comics Magazine (2001). Doom uses a time machine to get the Cube from the ocean floor, into which it had dropped during a battle between the Red Skull and Captain America.

A Cube—together with 11 other items from Marvel and DC Comics continuity—was used once again as a plot device in the intercompany crossover series JLA/Avengers #1–4 (Sept. 2003–April 2004, bi-monthly).

The Cube also shows up in Captain America (vol. 5). Aleksander Lukin wants the Cube and is willing to trade the Red Skull for it. The Red Skull claims he does not have it, but has spies out looking for it. Five years later, the Skull is in New York City and is in possession of it. General Lukin sent the Winter Soldier to retrieve the Cube from the Skull, and to kill him. The Skull transfers his mind into the body of Lukin through the powers of the Cube.

A fragment of a Cube empowered a new character that featured in a single storyline in Marvel Team-Up (vol. 3) #20–24 (July–Nov. 2006), and a Cube also appeared in Guardians of the Galaxy (vol. 2) #19 (Dec. 2009). The item added a new aspect to the abilities of the villain the Absorbing Man in The Mighty Avengers #32–33 (Feb.–March 2010). A new Cosmic Cube was revealed in Avengers Assemble #5 (July 2012); it was revealed to be a working facsimile with more limited powers than the 'real thing'.

Fictional item history
The Cosmic Cubes are actually containment devices created by various civilizations throughout the Marvel Universe at various times. Examples including the Skrulls (creators of the Cube that would eventually evolve into the Shaper of Worlds), and various other, unnamed civilizations (whose Cubes were gathered/stolen by unknown means by the Magus in the Infinity War story arc and the Goddess in the Infinity Crusade story arc). These matrices—which may or may not actually be shaped like a Cube—are suffused with reality-warping energies of unknown composition that comes from the realm of the Beyonders.

Unknown to almost everyone in the Marvel Universe, including its creators, the nature of the mysterious energies are such that, after a sufficient but undefined period of time, the matrix will become self-aware and evolve into an independent, free-willed being still possessed of the original Cube's tremendous powers; the new being's overall personality is psychically imprinted with the beliefs, desires, and personalities of those who wielded it as a Cube (for example, the Shaper of Worlds, wielded for a long time by an insane and warlike Skrull Emperor, immediately destroyed a large portion of the galaxy that it was located in once it became sentient).

On Earth, the Cosmic Cube containment matrix was developed and created by an evil society of para-military scientists known as A.I.M. to further their ultimate goal of world conquest. The object is revealed to be so powerful that it drove to insanity its co-creator MODOK. Master villain and former Nazi the Red Skull obtains the device after taking control of the mind of the A.I.M. agent holding it, using a handheld device. Although apparently now all-powerful, the Skull became overconfident and was tricked and defeated by the hero Captain America, who pretended to surrender and ask to be the Skull's slave, then knocked the Cube away, causing it to fall into the ocean. It was found by Prince Namor after Hercules accidentally revealed it to him, but while battling the Avengers he lost contact with it, and it fell into the Earth. The Mole Man found it, but threw it away, not realizing its true value. Later, a shard of the Cube is also used by A.I.M. to power the android known as the Super-Adaptoid, who is sent in an unsuccessful attempt to kill Captain America.

The Red Skull eventually retrieves the Cube and toys with Captain America, but the Skull is defeated when A.I.M. uses an object called the "Catholite Block" to dissolve the Cube.

The Cube was eventually found (apparently having reformed) by Thanos who, like the Red Skull, wishes to control the universe (this also attracts the amorous attention of the cosmic entity Death). Although opposed by superhero team the Avengers and the alien Kree warrior Captain Mar-Vell, Thanos becomes supreme when he wills the Cube to make him a part of—and therefore in control of—everything. Thanos discards the Cube, believing it to be drained of power, and is then stripped of the power by the dying superhero named Mar-Vell, who shatters the Cube and restores the universe.

Brought to research installation Project: Pegasus, the Cube was stolen by villain and cult leader Victorius, and is used to create the being Jude the Entropic Man. Both are neutralized when in simultaneous contact with the Cube (and the swamp monster the Man Thing). The Cube is returned to Pegasus by Captain America and the Fantastic Four member the Thing, where it eventually transforms the alien Wundarr into the entity the Aquarian.

A second Cube was created on the Island of Exiles by a team of scientists (including Arnim Zola) working for the Red Skull and the Hate-Monger. Planning to transfer his consciousness into the completed Cube, the Hate-Monger secretly arranged for a distraction in the form of a strike team from the spy organization S.H.I.E.L.D. attacking the island in an attempt to retrieve the Cube. However, the Red Skull was aware of his plans and had kept secret the fact that the Cube project had succeeded only in creating a perfect prison, but had failed to capture the mysterious, omnidimensional x-element which gives the Cubes their reality-warping power. As a result, the Hate-Monger's mind was left trapped in a powerless Cube in the Red Skull's possession. This Cube was one of the trophies that the Red Skull kept in his home, Skull House.

During a battle to stop A.I.M. from using the Cube once again, Captain America witnesses the Cube evolve into the entity called Kubik, which becomes a student of the Shaper of Worlds. Kubik returns to Earth when attracted by an anomaly possessing a fraction of its power, revealed to be the Super-Adaptoid. The Super-Adaptoid uses its abilities to "copy" Kubik's abilities and banishes the entity, intent on creating a race in its own image. The Adaptoid, however, is tricked into shutting down by Captain America. Kubik returns and then removes the sliver of the original Cosmic Cube from the Adaptoid that gave the robot its abilities.

Kubik also battles the renegade entity the Beyonder, and reveals to the entity and former Fantastic Four villain the Molecule Man that they are in fact both parts of an incomplete Cube (officially retconning the Beyonder's powers as shown in Secret Wars in the process), and convinces them to merge their powers. This forms a new being called Kosmos, who becomes the pupil of Kubik.

The character the Magus—an evil version of anti-hero Adam Warlock—acquires five Cosmic Cubes from neighboring universes, with each appearing in a different geometric form. The Magus uses mechanical aids to manipulate the Cubes, as their combined presence would quickly cause permanent brain damage. The character uses the Cubes to create evil doppelgangers of almost all of the Marvel heroes and then alters the universe, but is tricked and defeated when acquiring the Infinity Gauntlet, as the Reality Gem is revealed to be a fake, thus creating a gap in his powers.

Although the Magus is defeated, Warlock's "good side"—the female Goddess—also appears and wishes to purge the universe of all evil. To do this, she collects 30 containment units, with each storing the power of a Cosmic Cube, and merges them into a "Cosmic Egg". Despite the fact that the Egg can fulfill the Goddess' wishes—although, unlike the Infinity Gauntlet, it has no power over the soul—the character is defeated by Warlock and Thanos. During this time, the two questioned Mephisto about the origins of the Cubes in exchange for giving a Cube to Mephisto, but they were able to cheat the deal by giving Mephisto a drained Cube, as he never specified that the Cube had to still be functional.

A third Cosmic Cube was created by an Adaptoid-controlled faction of A.I.M. based on the island of Boca Caliente. This Cube was unstable and its reality-warping ability began to leak out onto the surrounding island, creating Cube constructs of anyone that was in the thoughts of nearby people. An Avengers team attempted to stop the Cube and the dying Captain America was willing to sacrifice himself to do so. In the end, it was an Adaptoid who had been accompanying Captain America and had been impressed by his heroic nature who ended the threat by willingly transforming itself into a non-sentient containment chamber for the Cube's energies.

The second Cube was eventually recovered by the KubeKult, fanatical followers of the Hate-Monger, who spied upon the A.I.M. Adaptoids and discovered how to power it. Fearing how the Hate-Monger would punish him for his betrayal, the Red Skull allied himself with then-rogue S.H.I.E.L.D. agent Sharon Carter to kidnap the dying Captain America and restore him to health. Reluctantly working together, the trio invaded a KubeKult base to steal the erratically functioning Cube, but the Red Skull seized it and willed Captain America to be drawn inside it into an artificial reality during World War II, where Captain America and Bucky were on a mission to kill Hitler. The Red Skull believed that he would be able to wield the Cube's power only if Captain America killed Hitler's consciousness within the Cube. However, the Bucky within the Cube (actually a projection of Captain America's own mind) revealed what was really going on and Captain America was able to will himself out of the Cube. Appearing before the Skull, Captain America threw his shield in such a way that it first severed the Skull's arm, causing him to drop the Cube, and then struck and shattered the Cube itself, causing an explosion that seemingly destroyed both itself and the Red Skull.

Months later, the Red Skull reappears, now with the Cube's power internalized within his body. He was approached by the time-traveler Kang the Conqueror (actually the disguised cosmic entity Korvac), who told him that the reason he had failed to completely control the Cube's power in the past was because his knowledge of the universe was incomplete. At the suggestion of "Kang", the Skull willed the starship of Galactus to travel to Earth so he could drain it of the needed information. At the same time, Korvac (now disguised as Uatu the Watcher) appeared to Captain America and Sharon Carter and managed to convince them that the only way to prevent the Skull from becoming unstoppable was for Captain America to kill him during a brief moment of vulnerability. Captain America did so, but as the Skull died, his body released the Cube energy, which flowed into "Uatu", who revealed his true identity and used his increased power to return to his alternate 31st century Earth to conquer it. However, Captain America followed him and fought him repeatedly, with Korvac rebooting the 31st century reality each time Captain America disturbed his perfectly ordered machine world. Eventually, Captain America managed to convince Korvac that the reason he was able to achieve anything at all against Korvac was due to there being too much humanity left within Korvac when he acquired the Cube's power. Accordingly, Korvac transported himself and Captain America back to just before the Skull died, but this time Captain America did not strike the fatal blow. Vulnerable to the Skull's power, Korvac teleported himself, Captain America and Carter aboard the starship, but the Skull soon found him and scattered Korvac across six dimensions. Soon afterwards, the Skull was tricked by Captain America into entering an anti-matter energy beam within the starship's engine room, which separated the Cube energy from him. Before the energy dissipated, Captain America and the Skull were each able to use its wish-granting ability to save themselves and Carter from death.

A Cosmic Cube was one of the 12 items of power sought by superhero teams the Avengers and the Justice League of America when they competed against each other in a game organized by Krona and the Grandmaster. It was the final item of the quest, found in the Savage Land, where both teams converged for a full-scale fight, during which Green Lantern Kyle Rayner was able to use the Cube as a substitute power source for his power ring when his usual battery had been stolen and the ring was running out of power. Quicksilver was finally able to gain the Cube, bringing the game to a stalemate, but to make sure Krona lost, Captain America helped Batman to take it, because they were the only ones, aside from the Atom, who knew the true stakes of the game: Krona had forced the Grandmaster to take the Justice League as his representatives, so the League had to win in order to prevent Krona from destroying the Marvel Universe. Batman briefly attempted to use the Cube to end the game — having been filled in on its capabilities by Captain America — before the Grandmaster took it from him to tally up the score. Enraged at his loss, Krona attacked the Grandmaster, who then used the Cube along with all other items of power to temporarily fuse the Marvel and DC Universes and imprison Krona in the intersection, hoping he would be unable to destroy a universe if his own existence were linked to it.

The Red Skull has finally created one by using pieces of the previous Cubes, and Aleksander Lukin wants it as much. The Red Skull is assassinated by the one person that Lukin was willing to trade for the Cube—the Winter Soldier. In the process of being assassinated, the Skull uses the Cube's power to transfer his mind into the body of Lukin for some time.

A youth called Curtis Doyle becomes the hero Freedom Ring when he finds a fragment of the original Cube in the form of a ring, which allows the altering of reality in a very limited area of 15 feet around the wearer. The character dies in battle saving Captain America, Spider-Man, Spider-Woman, and Wolverine from the villain Iron Maniac. The ring is later found by a friend of Doyle, a Skrull who had settled on Earth and adopts the name the 'Crusader'.

The powerful entity D'Spayre attempted to enhance his power by using a Cosmic Cube to draw on the grief of the general public in the aftermath of Captain America's assassination, only for his use of the Cube to have an apparently unintended side-effect when it granted the 'wish' of those who wanted Captain America back by drawing the Invaders into the present. He was defeated in a confrontation with the New Avengers when Echo proved immune to his powers due to her deafness, allowing her to take the Cube from him. The Cube is then used by Paul Anslem, a World War II soldier who had traveled with the Invaders against his will. Anslem's intentions to save his friends, who had died during an assault on a Nazi stronghold, allows the Red Skull of the World War II era to gain enough power to take over Earth. Anslem again regains control of the Cube with super-powered assistance and restores the timeline to what it should have been.

A Cube is also given to Guardians of the Galaxy member Star-Lord by time-traveling villain Kang the Conqueror to use against Adam Warlock's evil alter ego, the Magus.  However, the Magus altered perception to make it seem like the Cube's power was used up. Star-Lord used the Cube's last bit of energy for real by subduing the reborn Thanos, rendering it a "cosmic paperweight".

The Absorbing Man becomes capable of assimilating the abilities of a fraction of a Cube. He is stopped by criminal mastermind Norman Osborn, who uses a magical sword (provided by the Asgardian god Loki) to neutralize the Absorbing Man's abilities.

A new Cosmic Cube is later revealed to have been created by the U.S. government. It is stolen by members of the Zodiac at the behest of Thanos. Thanos' plot is later foiled by the combined might of the Avengers and the Guardians of the Galaxy.

During the Avengers: Standoff! storyline, Maria Hill and the rest of S.H.I.E.L.D. used pieces of a Cosmic Cube to create Kobik, a near-omnipotent child, originally conceived by Longshot and the Cosmic Cube "Miss Grapples". With Kobik's help, S.H.I.E.L.D. began brainwashing supervillains into becoming mild-mannered civilians, who were then imprisoned in a gated community called Pleasant Hill. When the villains rebel, Kobik decides to bring Steve Rogers, then reduced to an old man due to the breakdown of his Super-Soldier serum, back to his physical peak, but due to the Red Skull's influence over the Cube from which Kobik was made, she unknowingly replaces Rogers with a covert HYDRA loyalist version of him, believing that to be the "right" version of him. This results in the real Rogers' consciousness becoming trapped within the Cube until he finds Kobik and encourages her to set things right by showing the atrocities his doppelgänger had committed in the name of HYDRA during the Secret Empire storyline; she then brings him back to the real world, with some help from the heroes outside.

Mephisto was later revealed to apparently be able to reenergize with devilishly red hue the cosmic cube that Warlock and Thanos had given him so many years ago, which he named the Pandemonium Cube, otherwise referred to as the Hellahedron. Mephisto then gave the cube to Phil Coulson whom used it to remake the Marvel Universe into the Heroes Reborn Universe where Coulson became President of the United States, the Squadron Supreme replaced the Avengers and Mephisto is worshipped like a God. However the cube wasn't perfect, though. Somehow, Blade the Vampire Hunter of Earth-616 was unaffected by the reality warp and began gathering the Avengers to change reality back to its previous state.

As their perfect universe began to collapse on itself and the Avengers slowly start to see the cracks in the exposed fraud reality, Coulson decides to use the Pandemonium Cube again as a last-ditch effort to save everything he created only to witness his version of the world come to an end at the hands of Earth's Mightiest Heroes once the cube was apparently destroyed. However this defeat does not seem to have stung Mephisto at all, in fact, once reality has been set right again, Mephisto holding the Pandemonium Cube with Phil Coulson trapped inside, revealed that while his minion was defeated, the whole reality warp was only to bringing together 615 different Mepihstos from across the multiverse and to demonstrate how much reality could be changed by just one Mephisto.

Other versions

"Heroes Reborn"
In the "Heroes Reborn" miniseries, Phil Coulson and Mephisto used the Pandemonium Cube, or Hellahedron, to change reality so that the Squadron Supreme of America are Earth's mightiest heroes instead of the Avengers. After the latter group slowly reform and fight to change reality back however, Coulson attempts to use the Pandemonium Cube to defeat them. Despite his best efforts, Captain America steals it from Coulson and gives it to Echo and Star Brand to change reality back. Following this, Mephisto traps Coulson's soul in the Pandemonium Cube.

Ultimate Marvel
In the Ultimate Marvel imprint alternate universe title Ultimate Fantastic Four, Mister Fantastic builds a "cuboid volitional lattice" courtesy of a deliberate, subconscious suggestion from the Ultimate version of the Titan Thanos. Another version of the Cube exists as a creation of A.I.M. under the employment of Red Skull, which they stole blueprints of from the Fantastic Four's recently abandoned Baxter Building.

A version of the Cosmic Cube is seen in Project Pegasus alongside the Watcher and Infinity Gauntlet.

In other media

Television
 The Cosmic Cube appears in The Avengers: Earth's Mightiest Heroes. In the episode "Everything is Wonderful", A.I.M. creates it for HYDRA, though the former's leader MODOK secretly intends to swindle the latter. Upon discovering the cube's potential for their plans however, A.I.M. returns HYDRA's money and claims the project was a failure so they can use the cube for themselves. However, HYDRA leader Baron Strucker sees through MODOK's deception and a battle ensues between the two groups for possession of the cube in the subsequent episode "Hail Hydra". As a result, the Avengers intervene, defeat both groups, and claim the cube. Amidst the battle, Captain America holds it and unconsciously uses its power to revive his fallen comrade Bucky Barnes at the moment of his death.
 The Cosmic Cube, referred to as the Tesseract, appears in Avengers Assemble. In the episode "By the Numbers", the Avengers and the Cabal race to claim the Tesseract before the other group, with the latter succeeding in doing so. In "Exodus", the Red Skull builds a machine powered by the Tesseract to send the Cabal through various portals and conquer other worlds, but Iron Man foils the plot and turns the Cabal against him. Despite this, the Red Skull uses the Tesseract's power to become the Cosmic Skull and seek vengeance against the Avengers in "The Final Showdown". While he is defeated by the heroes and the Cabal, he escapes and presents the Tesseract to Thanos.

Marvel Cinematic Universe
An adapted version of the Cosmic Cube, referred to as the Tesseract, appears in media set in the Marvel Cinematic Universe (MCU). Sources outside of the films reveal that it was originally safeguarded by the Asgardians before it ended up on Earth.
 Introduced in the mid-credits scene of the live-action film Thor (2011), the Tesseract is shown to be in Nick Fury and S.H.I.E.L.D.'s custody.
 In the live-action film Captain America: The First Avenger (2011), the Tesseract is found by Hydra during World War II, who use it to create advanced weaponry. At the end of the war, it falls into the Arctic Ocean after transporting the Red Skull to space when he grabs it. It is later recovered by Howard Stark.
 In the live-action film The Avengers (2012), Loki steals the Tesseract from S.H.I.E.L.D. and uses it to create a portal to allow an invading army of Chitauri to attack the Earth, but they are defeated by the Avengers. After the battle, Thor takes the Tesseract back to Asgard.
 While the Tesseract does not appear in the live-action film Thor: The Dark World (2013), it is stated in this and the live-action film Avengers: Age of Ultron (2015) that it contains the Space Stone, one of six Infinity Stones.
 The Tesseract makes a brief appearance in the live-action film Thor: Ragnarok (2017), in which Loki steals it while helping Thor evacuate Asgard's population from Hela's wrath.
 In the live-action film Avengers: Infinity War (2018), Thanos attacks the Asgardians' escape ship and nearly kills Thor, forcing Loki to give the Tesseract to Thanos to save his brother's life. Thanos crushes the cube to free the Space Stone and place it in his Infinity Gauntlet before eventually initiating the Blip once he finds the remaining five Stones.
 In the live-action film Captain Marvel (2019), which takes place in the 1990s, Project Pegasus scientist Dr. Wendy Lawson attempts to use the Tesseract to build a light-speed engine. During a test run however, the engine explodes, granting Carol Danvers cosmic powers.
 As of the live-action film Avengers: Endgame (2019), Thanos has destroyed the Infinity Stones to prevent the Avengers from undoing the Blip. When the heroes discover time travel five years later, they use it to retrieve past versions of the Stones and build their own Infinity Gauntlet. Tony Stark and Scott Lang attempt to collect the Tesseract in the aftermath of the Avengers' battle with Loki in 2012, but inadvertently lose it to the 2012 Loki, who uses it to open a portal and escape from his Avengers' custody. In response, Stark and Steve Rogers travel to S.H.I.E.L.D. headquarters in 1970 and successfully obtain an earlier version of the Tesseract. Once the Avengers undo the Blip and defeat an alternate timeline version of Thanos who followed them to their time, Rogers returns the time-displaced Stones to their proper places in the timeline.
 In the Disney+ live-action series Loki episode "Glorious Purpose", the alternate 2012 Loki who escaped with his version of the Tesseract is captured by the Time Variance Authority, with the cube being depowered as the Infinity Stones do not work outside the multiverse.
 In the Disney+ animated series What If...? episode "What If... Captain Carter Were the First Avenger?", the Tesseract appears in an alternate timeline wherein Peggy Carter receives the Super Soldier Serum instead of Rogers.

Video games
 The MCU's Tesseract appears in Lego Marvel Super Heroes. Originally kept in Odin's vault on Asgard, it is stolen by Loki, who is defeated by Captain America, Thor, Wolverine, and the Human Torch. While the others are arguing over what they should do with the Tesseract, Wolverine grabs it and brings it to the X-Mansion in the hopes that Professor X can use it to locate Magneto. However, it is stolen by Magneto during the Brotherhood of Mutants' attack on the mansion and given to Doctor Doom, who uses it to power a ray gun to defeat Galactus before the latter destroys the Earth so that Doom can conquer it. Following Doom's defeat, Loki reveals that the ray gun is actually a mind control device, which he uses on Galactus in an attempt to destroy both Earth and Asgard. However, he is foiled by an alliance of heroes and villains who send Loki and Galactus through a wormhole. In the process, Thor destroys Loki's mind control device and the Tesseract is claimed by S.H.I.E.L.D. for safeguarding.
 The Cosmic Cube appears in Marvel's Avengers. This version is a containment device, codenamed "Project Omega", built by Monica Rappaccini of A.I.M. to prevent a future Kree invasion of Earth. When she used it however, the Cube froze her, Nick Fury, and nearby S.H.I.E.L.D. and A.I.M. agents and Kree Sentries in time while the rest of the world was eventually destroyed by a nuclear war and collapsed into chaos. The first two DLC expansion packs for the game, "Operation: Kate Bishop - Taking A.I.M." and "Operation: Hawkeye - Future Imperfect", focus on the Avengers trying to avert this apocalyptic future after learning about what happened from a time-travelling Hawkeye.

Miscellaneous
 A flawed Cosmic Cube appears in Steven A. Roman's Chaos Engine novel series, with the object passing between Doctor Doom, Magneto, and the Red Skull. As each of them use it to create his own unique version of a perfect world, a team of X-Men who were operating outside of their reality when the initial change occurred work to stop them. They eventually realize that the cube "superimposes" another alternate reality over the X-Men's world of origin, temporarily merging them with their counterparts until one of the Red Skull's lieutenants - who joined the Skull's group unaware of the scale of his evil - sacrifices himself to use the Cube to restore everything to normal.
 The Cosmic Cube appears in Marvel Universe Live!. This version is said to have the ability to corrupt any who attempt to use it. As such, Thor attempts to destroy it with Mjolnir. However, Loki uses a fragment of the cube to duplicate it for his own use, forcing the Avengers to retrieve the other fragments from Hydra, A.I.M., and the Sinister Six to stop him.

References

External links
 Cosmic Cube at the Marvel Database Project
 Tesseract at the Marvel Cinematic Database

Fictional cubes
Fictional elements introduced in 1966